Jenkin, of Franconian origin, is translated in English as "Little John" or more literally "John the little".

Forename history 
Jen/Jean (pronounced "Jon") being a diminutive of Jehan/Jehannes* (John/Johan*) followed by kin/ken meaning little creating Jenkin or Jenken.  *(Referred to as Johannes in the Latin and Germanic referring to the Bible name John.) 
The name "Jenkin" or "Jenken" first use in England is seen as early as 1086 as a diminutive of the English form of John. It was often translated from the Dutch/French as "John the younger" or seen as "John Jenken". The non-diminutive Jehan/Jehannes (pronounced "Jo-han/Jo-han-nes") was also translated into English as John. When Jen/Jean is present, usually given to a younger child, Jehan/Jehannes is listed as "John the elder" but, never translated as "Big John".  

Confusion can arise when the sire is listed as John, a son is John (the elder) and another son is John (the younger). Today, in English the term John, Senior is used for the father, while the names of John can use Junior or numeric designation (i.e. "II"). "Jon" the phonetic of John is sometimes seen but only in males as is the younger male nickname of "Johnny".  The name "Jean" once pronounced "Jon" in English and once a male name has become since the 16th century a female name in English from the French Jeanne.

Surname history 
Jenkin is a surname variant of Jenkins commonly seen in Welsh, Cornish and in English (mainly Devon) ancestry. Its translation is "Little John" or more literally "John the little". It first was found in Monmouthshire in the Domesday Book of 1086 and some say earlier than 1066 and the Norman Conquest of England.

Its common English use, eventually becoming a surname, may have come as a generic and now obsolete nickname as the "Little Johns". This may have been a 12th Century reference to the Welsh and Cornish people because of their relative smaller stature or more likely as a derogatory for the subjects or illegitimate offspring of King John of England, Earl of Cornwall and Gloucester (1166–1216). 

Jenkin or Jenkins and its surname variants should not be confused as a shortened Jenkinson and its variants which refers to the son of "Little John".

People with the surname 
Alan Jenkin (born 1962), Australian rules footballer
Albert Jenkin (1872–1961), Wales international rugby player
Anne Jenkin (born 1955), British politician
Bernard Jenkin (born 1959), British politician
Charles Frewen Jenkin (1865–1940), British engineer and academic
Dorothy Jenkin (1892–1995), New Zealand watercolorist, botanical illustrator and printmaker
Fleeming Jenkin (1833–1885), British engineer
Graham Jenkin (born 1938), Australian poet, historian, composer, and educator
Guy Jenkin (born 1955), British film director and comedy writer
Horrie Jenkin (1893–1985), Australian rules footballer
Kenneth Hamilton Jenkin (1900–1980), British writer on Cornish topics
Mark Jenkin (born 1976), Cornish director, editor, screenwriter, cinematographer and producer
Martin Jenkin (born 1975), English cricketer
Patrick Jenkin (1926–2016), British politician
Richard Jenkin (1925–2002), Cornish language scholar and politician
Robert Jenkin (1656–1727), English clergyman and nonjuror
T. J. Jenkin (1885–1965), Welsh professor of agriculture
Tim Jenkin (born 1948), South African writer, former anti-apartheid activist and political prisoner
Brown Jenkin, a “small, furry thing” with a human face in the horror story The Dreams in the Witch House by H. P. Lovecraft

People with the forename 
Jenkin Alban Davies (1885–1976), Welsh international rugby union player
Jenkin Coles (1843–1911), Australian politician
Jenkin Jones (disambiguation), several people
Jenkin Thompson (1911–1944), British Army doctor, awarded the George Cross
Jenkin Whiteside (1772–1822), American lawyer and politician

See also 
The surname of Jenkins.
Junkin
Little John
Jenkintown

References

Anglo-Cornish surnames
Surnames from given names